Galactic Cowboys is the eponymous debut album from the band of the same name.  The album was called "The most exciting release of 1991" by HM Magazine editor Doug Van Pelt.

Notes
 At the end of this album, bassist Monty Colvin can be heard reading a school lunch menu.
 Audio clips of Neil Armstrong talking to Houston control can be heard in both "Sea of Tranquility" and "Pump Up The Space Suit".
The song "Kaptain Krude" is written about the Exxon Valdez oil spill which happened in 1989.

Track listing

Personnel

Ben Huggins - Vocals, acoustic guitar, blues harp
Dane Sonnier - Guitar, vocals
Monty Colvin - Bass, vocals 
Alan Doss - Drums, vocals, attempted clarinet

Guest Musician
 Max Dyer - cello

References

External links
Galactic Cowboys lyrics

1991 debut albums
Galactic Cowboys albums